The following is a partial list of the "A" codes for Medical Subject Headings (MeSH), as defined by the United States National Library of Medicine (NLM).

This list continues the information at List of MeSH codes (A04). Codes following these are found at List of MeSH codes (A06). For other MeSH codes, see List of MeSH codes.

The source for this content is the set of 2006 MeSH Trees from the NLM.

– urogenital system

– genitalia

– genitalia, female
  – adnexa uteri
  – broad ligament
  – fallopian tubes
  – ovary
  – corpus luteum
  – luteal cells
  – ovarian follicle
  – follicular fluid
  – granulosa cells
  – theca cells
  – round ligament
  – uterus
  – cervix uteri
  – endometrium
  – decidua
  – deciduoma
  – myometrium
  – vagina
  – hymen
  – vulva
  – bartholin's glands
  – clitoris

– genitalia, male
  – bulbourethral glands
  – ejaculatory ducts
  – epididymis
  – penis
  – urethra
  – prostate
  – scrotum
  – seminal vesicles
  – spermatic cord
  – testis
  – leydig cells
  – rete testis
  – seminiferous tubules
  – blood-testis barrier
  – seminiferous epithelium
  – sertoli cells
  – vas deferens

– germ cells
  – ovum
  – oocytes
  – oogonia
  – zona pellucida
  – zygote
  – spermatozoa
  – sperm head
  – acrosome
  – sperm midpiece
  – sperm tail
  – spermatids
  – spermatocytes
  – spermatogonia

– gonads
  – ovary
  – testis

– urinary tract

– bladder

– kidney
  – kidney cortex
  – kidney glomerulus
  – glomerular basement membrane
  – mesangial cells
  – glomerular mesangium
  – juxtaglomerular apparatus
  – podocytes
  – kidney medulla
  – kidney pelvis
  – kidney calices
  – nephrons
  – kidney glomerulus
  – glomerular basement membrane
  – mesangial cells
  – glomerular mesangium
  – juxtaglomerular apparatus
  – podocytes
  – kidney tubules
  – bowman capsule
  – kidney tubules, collecting
  – kidney tubules, distal
  – kidney tubules, proximal
  – loop of henle

– ureter

– urethra

The list continues at List of MeSH codes (A06).

A05